Cameron Phillips may refer to:

 Cameron (Terminator), a fictional character in Terminator: The Sarah Connor Chronicles
 Cameron Phillips (broadcaster) (born 1969), Canadian radio broadcaster